Caorso is a comune (municipality) in the Province of Piacenza in the Italian region Emilia-Romagna, located about  northwest of Bologna and about  east of Piacenza.  

Caorso borders the following municipalities: Caselle Landi, Castelnuovo Bocca d'Adda, Cortemaggiore, Monticelli d'Ongina, Piacenza, Pontenure, San Pietro in Cerro.

Transportation 
Caorso has a railway station on the Piacenza–Cremona line.

References

External links
 Official website

Cities and towns in Emilia-Romagna